Doreen McCannell Botterill (born July 29, 1947) is a Canadian speed skater. She competed for Canada in speed skating at the 1964 and 1968 Winter Olympics. She had won the 1966 North American Senior Ladies Championship. In 1995, she was inducted into the Manitoba Sports Hall of Fame.

Personal life
McCannell-Botterill was born in Winnipeg, Manitoba. She is married to Cal Botterill, a sports psychologist who worked with the Canadian men's national hockey team. Her children are Jennifer Botterill and Jason Botterill. Jennifer participated in ice hockey at the Winter Olympics on four separate occasions. Jason was drafted by the Dallas Stars at the 1994 NHL Draft.

References

External links
 

1947 births
Canadian female speed skaters
Olympic speed skaters of Canada
Speed skaters from Winnipeg
Speed skaters at the 1964 Winter Olympics
Speed skaters at the 1968 Winter Olympics
Manitoba Sports Hall of Fame inductees
Living people